In enzymology, a citramalate CoA-transferase is an enzyme that catalyzes the chemical reaction

acetyl-CoA + citramalate  acetate + (3S)-citramalyl-CoA

Thus, the two substrates of this enzyme are acetyl-CoA and citramalate, whereas its two products are acetate and (3S)-citramalyl-CoA.

This enzyme belongs to the family of transferases, specifically the CoA-transferases.  The systematic name of this enzyme class is acetyl-CoA:citramalate CoA-transferase. This enzyme participates in c5-branched dibasic acid metabolism.

References

 

EC 2.8.3
Enzymes of unknown structure